Freginals is a municipality in the comarca of Montsià in 
Catalonia, Spain.

This town is located on a hill between the northern end of the Serra de Godall and the Serra del Montsià, not far from the forking of the roads between Tortosa, Ulldecona and Amposta. The area around the town has ancient passages of transhumant cattle herders known locally as lligallos.

The RENFE railway line from Valencia to Tortosa used to have a railway station in this town before 1990, but the station is now closed.

Freginals is part of the Taula del Sénia free association of municipalities.

References

External links 

Pàgina web de l'Ajuntament 
 Government data pages 

Municipalities in Montsià